Loch Eck (Gaelic: Loch Eich) is a freshwater loch located on the Cowal peninsula, north of Dunoon, Argyll and Bute, Scotland. Along with Loch Lomond, it is the only naturally occurring habitat of the Powan (fish). The loch also has salmon, sea trout, brown trout and arctic charr.

Loch Eck is within the Argyll Forest Park which, is itself part of the Loch Lomond and The Trossachs National Park. It is close to the Benmore Botanic Garden and the Benmore Outdoor Centre, which uses the loch and its surrounding for outdoor learning.

The A815 road bounds the east side. A pathway runs along the west side of the loch, and gives access to the Paper Caves, set in the steep hillside with caving access to a platform set above a steep scarp within the cave. A legend holds that the Argyll family documents were hidden in the caves when the 9th Earl of Argyll was arrested, to prevent his lands from being made forfeit.

The loch is also an impounding reservoir with a water treatment works, that were upgraded in 2012 by Scottish Water, which supplies the freshwater to much of the southeast of Cowal, including Dunoon.

In July 2013, two dogs died due to algal bloom present in the loch. Warnings were then posted advising that people and animals should avoid contact with the water. Recently, three further incidents have happened, one in June 2019 and two in July 2021.

The actress Emma Thompson owns a house on the shore of the loch.

See also

List of reservoirs and dams in the United Kingdom

References

Sources

 ARGYLL AND BUTE COUNCIL RESERVOIRS ACT 1975 PUBLIC REGISTER
 Gazetteer for Scotland - Historical Perspective for Loch Eck

External links

 Lock Eck page on Loch Lomond and The Trossachs National Park website

Eck
Eck
Eck
Cowal